Kakaalaneo was chief of the island of Maui.

Biography 
Kakaalaneo was a son of King Kaulahea I of Maui and Chiefess Kapohanaupuni of Hilo. His brother was King Kakae. Kakaalaneo appears to be the center of the legends of that reign. He and his brother, appears to have jointly ruled Maui and Lānai with his elder brother holding the title of Moi.

The brothers' courts were at Lāhainā. 
 
Tradition has gratefully remembered him as the one who planted the breadfruit trees in Lāhainā, for which the place in later times became so famous for.

Legend of Kaululaʻau
A marvelous legend is still told of one of Kakaalaneo's sons, named Kaululaau, who, for some of his wild pranks at his father's court in Lāhainā, was banished to Lānai, which island was said to have been terribly haunted by Akua-ino, ghosts and goblins. Kaululaau, however, by his prowess and skill, exorcised the spirits, brought about peace and order on the island, and was in consequence restored to the favour of his father.

Family 
It was said that Kaululaau's mother was Kanikaniaula of the Kamauaua family, through Haili, a brother of Keoloewa. One legend mentions six children of Kaululaau by the names of Kuihiki, Kuiwawau, Kuiwawau-e, Kukahaulani, Kumakaakaa, and Ulamealani. No further record of them are kept, however.

With another wife, named Kaualua, Kakaalaneo had a son Kaihiwalua, who was the father of Luaia, who became the husband of the noted Kūkaniloko, daughter of Piliwale, the King of Oahu, son of Kālonaiki, and brother of Lo Lale. Kakaalaneo is also said to have had a daughter named Wao, who caused the watercourse in Lāhainā called Auwaiawao to be dug and named after her.

He was succeeded by his nephew Kahekili I, son of his brother.

References 
 

Royalty of Maui
Hawaiian legends